The Chief of the Philippine National Police (abbreviated as C, PNP;) is the head of the Philippines' national police body, the Philippine National Police (PNP). The position is invariably held by a Police General, a four-star general police officer.

The PNP chief is also an ex officio member of the National Police Commission as a commissioner.

Eligibility
The Department of the Interior and Local Government Act of 1990 (Republic Act No. 6975), the law establishing the Philippine National Police, states that the President shall appoint the Philippine National Police Chief from among a list prepared by the National Police Commission (NAPOLCOM) of "the most senior and qualified officers in the service" given that the prospect appointee has not yet retired or within six months from their compulsory retirement age. The lowest rank of a qualified appointee shall be the rank of Police Brigadier General. The appointment of the PNP chief by the President requires confirmation from the Commission on Appointments.

Powers and functions
The holder of the position of PNP Chief holds the rank of "Police General". Prior to February 2019, this rank was known as "Director General", According to Sec. 26 of the PNP Chief shall have:

Command and direction of the PNP; the power to direct and control tactical as well as strategic movements, deployment, placement, utilization of the PNP or any of its units and personnel, including its equipment, facilities and other resources. Such command and direction of the Chief of the PNP may be delegated to subordinate officials with the respect to the units under their respective commands, in accordance with the rules and regulation prescribed by the Commission.
Power to issue detailed implementing policies and instructions regarding personnel, funds, properties, records, correspondence and such other matters as may be necessary to effective carry out the functions, powers and duties of the Bureau.

Tenure
Under Republic Act No. 6975, the term of office of PNP Chief cannot exceed four years. An exception can be made by the President to extend the PNP chief's term "in times of war or other national emergency declared by Congress".

Command Group
The PNP Chief is assisted by the Command Group. The current deputy chief for administration is P/Lt. Gen. Rhodel O. Sermonia (OIC),  the current deputy chief for operations  is P/Lt. Gen. Benjamin D. Santos Jr. and the Chief of the Directorial Staff is P/Lt. Gen. Arthur V. Bisnar.

List
The following lists people who have assumed the position of Chief of the Philippine National Police. This includes people who served as Officer in Charge (OIC) of the PNP. This excludes OIC tenure due to temporary incapacitation of filing of a leave on absence of the incumbent – who would later resume fulfilling their duties.

References 

 
Philippine National Police
Lists of office-holders in the Philippines